Scopula gazellaria is a moth of the  family Geometridae. It is found in Lesotho, South Africa and Zimbabwe.

References

Moths described in 1863
gazellaria
Moths of Africa